Mohindra Kumar Ghosh (1893-1982) was an Indian politician. He was a Member of Parliament, representing Jamshedpur in the Lok Sabha the lower house of India's Parliament as a member of the Indian National Congress.

References

External links
Official biographical sketch in Parliament of India website

Lok Sabha members from Bihar
Indian National Congress politicians
India MPs 1957–1962
1893 births
1982 deaths
Indian politicians
Indian National Congress politicians from Bihar